sadio mane kuzaliwa senegari club @simba senegar football midfielder who plays for the amateur French side TVEC Les Sables-d'Olonne.

Career
Nikiema began his career with Planète Champion Ouagadougou was in 2001 scouted from Bordeaux. He played 42 games, who scores one goal for the reserve team from Bordeaux and joined than to Ligue 2 club Niort. After three years and 20 games with one goal left Niort and signed in January 2009 with Qingdao Jonoon.

International
Nikiema has had 7 caps for Burkina Faso. He was member on youth side at 2003 FIFA World Youth Championship and 2001 FIFA U-17 World Championship.

Personal
He is the older brother of Victor Nikiema.

References

External links
 
 

1985 births
Living people
Burkinabé footballers
Burkina Faso international footballers
2010 Africa Cup of Nations players
Planète Champion players
FC Girondins de Bordeaux players
Chamois Niortais F.C. players
Qingdao Hainiu F.C. (1990) players
C.D. Trofense players
Chinese Super League players
Liga Portugal 2 players
Burkinabé expatriate footballers
Expatriate footballers in China
Expatriate footballers in Portugal
Burkinabé expatriate sportspeople in China
Burkinabé expatriate sportspeople in Portugal
Sportspeople from Ouagadougou
Association football midfielders
21st-century Burkinabé people